Scabiosa lucida, commonly known as shining scabious, is a species of flowering plants in the honeysuckle family (Caprifoliaceae).

Taxonomy
Scabiosa lucida contains the following subspecies:
 Scabiosa lucida stricta
 Scabiosa lucida lucida
 Scabiosa lucida pseudobanatica

References

lucida
Plants described in 1779